Clark Bishop (born March 29, 1996) is a Canadian professional ice hockey center currently playing with the Calgary Wranglers in the American Hockey League (AHL) while under contract with the Calgary Flames of the National Hockey League (NHL). He was selected by the Carolina Hurricanes in the 2014 NHL Draft (5th round, 127th overall).

Playing career
Born in St. John's, Newfoundland and Labrador, Bishop played for Avalon Minor Hockey and later for the St. John's Pennecon Privateers, before joining the Cape Breton Screaming Eagles of the Quebec Major Junior Hockey League in 2012. During his four-year tenure with the Screaming Eagles, he made 214 appearances (including 12 playoff games) for the team, scoring 63 goals and assisting on 75 more. He served as team captain in 2014–15 and 2015–16.

Bishop inked a three-year entry-level contract with the Carolina Hurricanes of the National Hockey League (NHL) on April 4, 2016. On October 17, 2018, Bishop was called up from the Hurricanes American Hockey League (AHL) affiliate, the Charlotte Checkers, and he made his NHL debut on October 20 in a 3–1 loss to the Colorado Avalanche. Bishop was reassigned to the Checkers on October 23. Bishop was recalled again on November 29 after Haydn Fleury was placed on injured reserve. He recorded his first career NHL goal on December 7 in a 4–1 win over the Anaheim Ducks. On December 16, Bishop was reassigned to the Charlotte Checkers.

Bishop bounced between the Hurricanes and Checkers in the 2018–19 season, playing in 20 regular season games and two playoff games for Carolina as a fourth-line center. With the Checkers he won the AHL's Calder Cup. At the opening of the 2019–20 season, Bishop failed to make the Hurricanes out of training camp and was placed on waivers for the purposes of assigning him to Charlotte. He cleared waivers and was assigned to Charlotte where he played the majority of the season. He appeared in five games for the Hurricanes, registering one point.

In October 13, 2020, Bishop signed a one-year extension with the Hurricanes. After attending the Hurricanes training camp for the delayed 2020–21 season, Bishop failed to make the roster and was placed on waivers. On January 12, 2021, he was traded by Carolina to the Ottawa Senators in exchange for Maxime Lajoie. He was directly assigned to join AHL affiliate, the Belleville Senators. Bishop was recalled to Ottawa on March 1. He made his debut for the Senators on March 12, 2021 against the Edmonton Oilers. On April 9, 2021, Bishop was again placed on waivers. He finished the season playing in thirteen games with Ottawa, registering three points. 

On May 21, 2021, Bishop was re-signed by the Senators to a one-year, two-way contract extension. During the Senators training camp , Bishop suffered an injury that kept him out of the lineup until November. He split the season between Ottawa and Belleville, playing in nine games with Ottawa, registering one point.

As a free agent from the Senators, Bishop was signed to a one-year, two-way contract with the Calgary Flames on July 13, 2022.

International play
Bishop was part of Canada's U18 national team that won the 2013 Ivan Hlinka Memorial Tournament in Breclav and Piestany. The same year, he represented Canada Atlantic at the World Under-17 Hockey Challenge in Victoriaville and Drummondville, Québec.

Career statistics

Regular season and playoffs

International

Awards and honours

References

External links

1996 births
Living people
Belleville Senators players
Calgary Wranglers players
Canadian ice hockey centres
Cape Breton Screaming Eagles players
Carolina Hurricanes draft picks
Carolina Hurricanes players
Charlotte Checkers (2010–) players
Florida Everblades players
Ice hockey people from Newfoundland and Labrador
Ottawa Senators players
Sportspeople from St. John's, Newfoundland and Labrador